Khoudir Aggoune (born 5 January 1981 in Souk El-Thenine, Béjaïa Province) is an Algerian long-distance runner who specializes in the 5000 metres. He competed at the 2004 Summer Olympics in the 5000m metres and came 10th in his heat  with a time of 13:29.37, he didn't advance to the next stage.

Achievements

Personal bests
1500 metres - 3:38.58 min (2006)
3000 metres - 7:43.63 min (2003)
5000 metres - 13:10.16 min (2006)
10000 meters- 27:58.03 min (2008),(NR)

External links

1981 births
Living people
Algerian male long-distance runners
Athletes (track and field) at the 2004 Summer Olympics
Athletes (track and field) at the 2008 Summer Olympics
Olympic athletes of Algeria
People from Souk El Ténine, Béjaïa Province
Athletes (track and field) at the 2001 Mediterranean Games
Athletes (track and field) at the 2005 Mediterranean Games
Mediterranean Games bronze medalists for Algeria
World Athletics Championships athletes for Algeria
Mediterranean Games medalists in athletics
Athletes (track and field) at the 2003 All-Africa Games
Athletes (track and field) at the 2007 All-Africa Games
African Games competitors for Algeria
Islamic Solidarity Games competitors for Algeria
Islamic Solidarity Games medalists in athletics
21st-century Algerian people